Hawaku  is a village development committee in the Himalayas of Terhathum District in the Kosi Zone of eastern Nepal. At the time of the 1991 Nepal census it had a population of 3390 people living in 589 individual households. A higher secondary school is the only school of Hwaku. It is bordered with IWa, Sakranti, Nighuradin (Taplejung) and Amarpur (Panchthar). The Tamor river lies to the east Hwaku making it an area suitable for cultivation.

References

External links
UN map of the municipalities of Terhathum District

Populated places in Tehrathum District